Global Shares is a fintech company headquartered In Clonakilty, Ireland, managing employee equity plans for startups, tech companies and enterprise brands.

Its platform provides equity management and administration solutions to corporate clients and their employees. The company is regulated under MiFID and FINRA with around 650 staff members and 18 offices in the US, the UK, Germany, Spain, Portugal, Malta, Saudi Arabia, Hong Kong, Japan and China.

The company was listed in the top 30 medium-sized Best Workplaces in Ireland in 2021 (rank 17) and 2022 (rank 25)

In March 2022, JPMorgan Chase agreed to acquire Global Shares, with the acquisition closing in August 2022.

Software and services 
Global Shares software platform provides trading, financial reporting, business intelligence reporting, global compliance, employee portal, capitalisation table management and scenario modelling.

History and development 
2005: Global shares is founded as a service-based company

2008: Tim Houstoun (current CEO) joins the company

2015: The company expands into software solutions

2017: The company wins the Deloitte 'FinTech Company of the Year' award

2018: The company increases employee headcount and expands to Spain, Japan and the US.

2020: Tim is announced as a finalist in the EY Entrepreneur of the year award. In the same year, the company launched a new version of its product and won the 'Company of the Year Award 2020 - IT' 

2021: Global Shares was listed in the top 30 medium-sized Best Workplaces™ in Ireland. The company is also the winner of Technology Ireland’s ‘Company of the Year 2021’

2022: JPMorgan Chase acquired Global Shares for €665 million. It is the second year the company to be listed as one of the Best Workplaces in Ireland.

References

2022 mergers and acquisitions
Business in Ireland
Companies based in Cork (city)
Employee stock ownership
Employee stock option
Irish subsidiaries of foreign companies